An Ethnic Affairs Minister is a representative elected by an ethnic minority in a given state or region of Myanmar if that division is composed of an ethnic minority population of 0.1 percent or greater of the total populace [roughly 51,400 people]. If one of the country's ethnic minorities counts their state of residence as its namesake, however, it is not granted an ethnic affairs minister (e.g. there is no Mon ethnic affairs minister in Mon State). Only voters who share an ethnic identity with a given ethnic affairs minister post are allowed to vote for candidates to the position.

Composition
There are currently 29 Ethnic Affairs Ministers elected to the State and Regional Hluttaws, with the number of Ministers per Hluttaw ranging from 1 to 7 sitting at once. Ethnic Affairs Ministers are considered to be a member of their State or Regional legislature, but unlike State MPs represent a geographically dispersed ethnic group, and are accountable only to them for the purposes of re-election. Ethnic Affairs Ministers are elected in all but one of Myanmar's states and regions, with only Chin State electing no Ministers at all.

Ministers are not elected for ethnicities that are a majority of their state/region, or where a state/region already has a self-administered district or self-administered zone dedicated to those ethnic groups. Groups represented by an Ethnic Affairs Minister in a particular state do not need to be a minority elsewhere in the country - the Bamar people have ministers in Shan, Kayin, Kachin, Kayah, and Mon States, despite forming a majority of approximately 68% of the population nationwide. Likewise, some minorities such as the Rakhine may have Ethnic Affairs Ministers in some regions of the country where they are a minority despite also having their own namesake state where they are a majority.

Currently 14 different ethnic groups are eligible to vote for at least one Ethnic Affairs Minister, although they may only do so if they reside within the state for which the minister is elected. Despite meeting the criteria, the Danu, Kokang, Naga, Palaung, and Wa people are ineligible to elect a minister because they enjoy self-determination within a designated Self-Administered Zone or Division.

Current Ethnic Affairs Ministers

The current Ethnic Affairs Ministers were elected in the 2015 General Election, which resulted in a sweeping victory for the National League for Democracy.

|-
|colspan=2 |Total
|style="text-align: right;"| 29 
|
|style="text-align: right;" | 100 
|style="text-align: right;" |100
|
|

See also 

 Demographics of Myanmar
 Politics of Burma
 State and Region Hluttaws

References

Government of Myanmar